"Turn Around" is a 2001 song created by the musical project, Enigma. The single was the only one which was released from the compilation album, Love Sensuality Devotion: The Greatest Hits.

Single track listing
 2-track CD single
 "Turn Around (Radio Edit)" – 3:53
 "Gravity of Love (Chilled Club Mix)" – 5:27

 3-track CD single with video
 "Turn Around (Radio Edit)" – 3:53
 "Turn Around (Northern Lights Club Mix)" – 10:40
 "Gravity of Love (Chilled Club Mix)" – 5:27
 "Turn Around Multimedia Track"

Charts
 #45 (Switzerland)
 #65 (Germany)

Enigma (German band) songs
2001 songs
Songs written by Jens Gad
Songs written by Michael Cretu
Song recordings produced by Michael Cretu
Virgin Records singles
EMI Records singles